Bruno Perreau (PhD, Paris I Sorbonne) is the Cynthia L. Reed Professor of French Studies at the Massachusetts Institute of Technology. He is also Non-Resident Faculty at the Center for European Studies, Harvard.

Perreau taught political science, law, and gender studies at Sciences Po, where he opened with Françoise Gaspard the first undergraduate course on LGBT politics. Perreau has been a member of the Institute for Advanced Study (Princeton), a Newton fellow in sociology and a Jesus College research associate at the University of Cambridge, and, more recently, a fellow at Stanford Humanities Center. He is currently Burkhardt Fellow at the Center for Advanced Study in the Behavioral Sciences, Stanford, and a visiting scholar in the department of comparative literature at UC Berkeley.

At the intersection of the humanities and the social sciences, Perreau's research investigates how the law is manufactured in contemporary Western societies. How are juridical categories instituted and, once they are, why do they seem so obvious? While the law is often thought of as nothing more than a technique, Perreau explores its social, political, and aesthetic foundations: what conditions have to be in place for a policy to be successful and become law? His work shows that “nature” is one of the main registers undergirding the manufacture of law in contemporary Western societies. Perreau maintains that our relation to community, a relation commonly designated as “culture,” is understood as if it were a “second nature.” Starting with an epistemological line of enquiry, Perreau's research has very concrete repercussions. He asks how have our daily lives been marked by this imaginary construction of nature, whether in terms of our nationality, our relations to family, our social tastes, or our identities?

The Politics of Adoption
In France, the process for authorizing an adoption is understood as a “moment of truth” over the course of which administrative categories and social identities enter into a confrontation. Gender is a crucial aspect of this encounter, and the decision to accept or reject an application (by a single man, a woman past menopause, a homosexual person, a married couple, etc.) gives insight into what constitutes a legitimate family in France. To understand how the production of the family and the production of the state are linked, The Politics of Adoption offers a study of parliamentary debates since 1945 alongside French and European case law. It also casts light on social work through a statistical analysis of the different types of justification offered by child social welfare agents when surveyed on the topic of homosexual people who apply for adoption. Perreau's contention is that adoption policies evidence a pastoral power: candidates are not evaluated for what they are but for what they should be. The state is considered as a guide for its citizens who wish to become parents because the state needs them to produce young citizens who fully acknowledge its authority. According to philosopher Judith Butler, Perreau offers "a way of understanding adoption policy as no less than a way of rearticulating political modernity."

Queer theory in France
Perreau's most recent research discusses various facets of the French response to queer theory, from the mobilization of activists and the seminars of scholars to the emergence of queer media and translations. It sheds new light on recent events around gay marriage in France, where opponents to the 2013 law saw queer theory as a threat to French family. Perreau questions the return of French Theory to France from the standpoint of queer theory, thereby exploring the way France conceptualizes America. By examining mutual influences across the Atlantic, he seeks to reflect on changes in the idea of national identity in France and the United States, offering insight on recent attempts to theorize the notion of “community” in the wake of Maurice Blanchot's work. Queer Theory: The French Response offers a theory of minority politics that considers an ongoing critique of norms as the foundation of citizenship, in which a feeling of belonging arises from regular reexamination of it.

Minority democracy
Inspired by his current focus on the legal interface between minority and majority cultures, Perreau is currently researching the possibility of a “minority democracy.” Minorities, which experience both exclusion and conditional assimilation (“passing”), denature the clarity of the majority relationship to the law, notably political representation. He explores precedents from Condorcet's social mathematics to affirmative action in the United States and France via proportional representation in Israel and Germany. This new approach brings his previous research into the development of a sense of belonging to bear on the way society conceptualizes legal rights. Minority democracy would not entail a mode of decision-making that replaces majority rule by minority rule, but rather a system that recognizes the minority dimension existing in all of us. Perreau coined the concept of intrasectionality to refer to the presence of others in each of us. He concludes that the way in which each individual is treated, particularly by the law, depends on the treatment of others. The result is a solidarist vision of identity that moves away from the more fragmentary approach promoted by the notion of intersectionality.

Books
 Qui a peur de la théorie queer? Presses de Sciences Po, 2018.
 Queer Theory: The French Response. Stanford University Press, 2016.
 The Politics of Adoption. Gender and the Making of French Citizenship. The MIT Press, 2014.
Penser l'adoption. La gouvernance pastorale du genre. Presses Universitaires de France, 2012.
Le Président des États-Unis (with Christine Ockrent). Dalloz, 2008.
Cinquante ans de vie politique française. Le débat sur la fin de la Cinquième République. Librio, 2007.
Homosexualité. Dix clés pour comprendre, vingts textes à découvrir. Forewords Jack Lang, Librio, 2005.

Edited books
 Les défis de la République. Genre, territoires, citoyenneté (with Joan W. Scott). Presses de Sciences Po, forthcoming 2017.
Le choix de l'homosexualité. Recherches inédites sur la question gay et lesbienne. EPEL, 2007.
Homoparentalités. Approches scientifiques et politiques (with Anne Cadoret, Martine Gross and Caroline Mécary). Forewords Bertrand Delanoë, Presses universitaires de France, 2006.

References

External links
 MIT Personal Webpage 

University of Paris alumni
French political scientists
Living people
Institute for Advanced Study visiting scholars
French male non-fiction writers
1976 births
MIT School of Humanities, Arts, and Social Sciences faculty
Harvard University faculty
Academic staff of Sciences Po